A by-election will be held in the Cook Islands constituency of Arutanga-Reureu-Nikaupara on 13 October 2016. The by-election was called after One Cook Islands Movement leader Teina Bishop was convicted of corruption as a Minister in July 2016.

The by-election was won by One Cook Islands candidate Pumati Israela.

References

By-elections in the Cook Islands
Arutanga
Arutanga
Cook